Chailey Secondary School is a comprehensive secondary school located in the village of South Chailey, Chailey, just outside Lewes in East Sussex, UK. Chailey School was awarded specialist Language College Status in July 2002. In the year 2007, the school was also awarded Humanities College status. The school also provides adult classes in French, Italian, and Spanish. It does not have a sixth form.

In 2007 at least 99% of students acquired one GCSE at grades A*–G and in 2009, 82% of students achieved 5 or more A*–C grades with 72% achieving 5 or more including English and maths.  The school academic program spans a range of disciplines including arts, sciences or humanities.

The current head teacher is Helen Key. She has been head teacher since 2016.

In 2008 it celebrated its 50th anniversary since opening as a secondary modern in 1958. On 6 June 2008, The Duchess of Gloucester visited the school to attend a citizenship ceremony, the first of its kind to be held in a school with students present. This was to coincide with the school's 50th anniversary.

Drama and music
The school usually presents two shows each year, performed by the students. This normally consists of one musical and one showcase piece each academic year, with the musical most commonly taking place in the last week of the Christmas term. In the last few years, such shows have included Annie (musical) and 13 (musical)

Chailey School has taken part in the Shakespeare Schools Festival for several years. It is a national event and each school taking part produces a 30-minute adaptation of a famous Shakespearean play. The last few years have seen Chailey produce pieces such as As You Like It, A Midsummer Night's Dream and Twelfth Night.

Houses
The house groups, known as forms, are named after local hills and landmarks. The most forms in a year group has been seven.
 Ashdown
 Charington
 Ditchling
 Firle
 Ringmer, main sports rival, school, same design.
 Weald (only used for year groups with six forms or more, currently only the class of 2015 and 2016)
 Keymer (only used for year groups with seven forms)
 Caburn
 Glynde

Notable former pupils
 Piers Morgan, television presenter and former Daily Mirror editor
 Perou, fashion, portrait and music photographer
 Cleo Demetriou, So Awkward actor

References

External links

Secondary schools in East Sussex
Educational institutions established in 1958
1958 establishments in England
Community schools in East Sussex
Specialist language colleges in England
Specialist humanities colleges in England